RPL may refer to:

Public Safety 
 Registured Public Safety Leader (RPL)  Association of Public-Safety Communications Officials-International

Medicine and biology 
 Recurrent Pregnancy Loss: recurrent miscarriages

Computing 
 Raptor Lake series Intel CPUs
 Real-time Programming Language
 Reciprocal Public License
 Remote Program Load, a network boot protocol
 RPL (programming language) for HP calculators 1984–2015
 Routing Protocol for Low power and Lossy Networks, a networking protocol

Other uses 
 Ramped Powered Lighter, a British landing craft
 Recognition of prior learning, to evaluate learning outside the classroom
, propaganda department of the Nazi Party
 Recycled plastic lumber
 Richmond Public Library, in British Columbia, Canada.
 Russian Premier League, association football league

See also 
RP 1 (disambiguation)
RPI (disambiguation)